In mathematics, a tricategory is a kind of structure of category theory studied in higher-dimensional category theory.

Whereas a weak 2-category is said to be a bicategory, a weak 3-category is said to be a tricategory (Gordon, Power & Street 1995; Baez & Dolan 1996; Leinster 1998).

Tetracategories are the corresponding notion in dimension four. Dimensions beyond three are seen as increasingly significant to the relationship between knot theory and physics. John Baez, R. Gordon, A. J. Power and Ross Street have done much of the significant work with categories beyond bicategories thus far.

See also

 Weak n-category

References

External links
The Dimensional Ladder
Branches of higher dimensional algebra

Higher category theory